José Carlos Fernández may refer to:
José Carlos Fernández (Bolivian footballer) (1971-), Bolivian football goalkeeper
José Carlos Fernández (Peruvian footballer) (1983-), Peruvian footballer
José Carlos Fernández Vázquez (1987-), Spanish footballer

See also
Lito Vidigal (1969-), Angolan footballer, born José Carlos Fernandes Vidigal

See also 
Carlos Fernandes (disambiguation)
Carlos Fernández (disambiguation)
José Fernández (disambiguation)